Fireball: Visitors from Darker Worlds is a 2020 documentary film directed by Werner Herzog and Clive Oppenheimer. The film explores the cultural, spiritual, and scientific impact of meteorites, and the craters they create around the globe.

It had its world premiere at the Toronto International Film Festival on September 10, 2020. It was released on Apple TV+ on November 13, 2020.

Production 
The inspiration for the film came from Clive Oppenheimer's visit to a South Korean lab that studies and displays meteorites. Enamored with the exotic nature of the stones, and "the cultural significance of meteorites and impact craters to human societies around the world", he spoke with Werner Herzog about creating this documentary.

The production filmed across 12 different locations, in 6 different continents.

Release 
In July 2020, Apple acquired the distribution rights to the film. The film premiered at the 2020 Toronto International Film Festival on September 10, 2020. It was released on Apple TV+ on November 13, 2020.

Critical reception 
The website's critical consensus reads, "Much like the cosmic debris it investigates, Fireball: Visitors from Darker Worlds is made up of heavy stuff -- but it lights up the screen thanks to Werner Herzog's infectious awe." On Metacritic, the film has a weighted average score of 72 out of 100, based on 17 critics, indicating "generally favorable reviews".

The film received a nomination for the 2020 Critics' Choice Documentary Awards for Best Narration.

References

External links 
 Fireball: Visitors from Darker Worlds – official site
 Fireball: Visitors from Darker Worlds on IMDb
 Fireball: Visitors from Darker Worlds on Rotten Tomatoes
 Fireball: Visitors from Darker Worlds on Metacritic

2020 documentary films
2020 films
Films directed by Werner Herzog
Meteorites in culture
American documentary films
2020s American films